Røbekk is a village in Molde Municipality in Møre og Romsdal county, Norway. The Årø neighborhood (and the location of Molde Airport, Årø) lies immediately to the west of Røbekk. The European route E39 highway runs through the village on its way from the town of Molde towards the village of Batnfjordsøra in Gjemnes Municipality. Røbekk Church has been located in this village since 1898.

References

Villages in Møre og Romsdal
Molde